Elachista multidentella is a moth in the family Elachistidae. It was described by Sinev and Sruoga in 1995. It is found in south-eastern Siberia and Japan.

References

Moths described in 1995
multidentella
Moths of Asia